Rodrigo Mazur (born 3 January 1992) is an Argentine professional footballer who plays as a left-back for Defensores de Belgrano.

Career
Ferro Carril Oeste became Mazur's first senior club in 2014. He made his professional debut against Independiente Rivadavia on 26 February, having been an unused substitute days prior versus Atlético Tucumán. In a game with Gimnasia y Esgrima in 2015, in what was his fifty-third appearance, Mazur netted his first goal during a 1–0 win. He made a total of eighty-three appearances and scored thrice in his opening six seasons.

Personal life
Mazur is the brother of fellow professional footballer Federico Mazur.

Career statistics
.

References

External links

1992 births
Living people
Footballers from Buenos Aires
Argentine footballers
Association football defenders
Primera Nacional players
Ferro Carril Oeste footballers
Instituto footballers
Defensores de Belgrano footballers